Benjamin Dreyer (born May 11, 1958) is an American writer and copy editor. He is copy chief at Random House and the author of Dreyer’s English: An Utterly Correct Guide to Clarity and Style (2019).

Early life 
Dreyer was born May 11, 1958 in a Jewish family. He grew up in Queens, New York and Albertson, Long Island. He attended Northwestern University.

Career 
Early in his career, Dreyer pursued writing and acting. He worked in bars and restaurants before turning to freelance proofreading, then copy editing. In 1993 he joined Random House full time as a production editor. He was promoted from group manager to senior managing editor and copy chief in 2008 and now serves as vice-president, executive managing editor and copy chief, at the Random House division of Penguin Random House. Supervising the publication of hundreds of titles a year—The New York Times describes Dreyer's role as "style-arbiter-of-last-resort"—he works only with novelist Elizabeth Strout as the sole author he continues to copy-edit himself.

Dreyer's English: An Utterly Correct Guide to Clarity and Style was published in the US on January 29, 2019, with a UK edition to follow on May 30, 2019. Dreyer began the project as a revision of an internal memo to advise copy editors and proofreaders at Random House. The memo expanded to about 20 pages and eventually Dreyer became interested in developing it as a book, published with Random House. Dreyer's English debuted at number nine on The New York Times bestseller list for "Advice, How-To & Miscellaneous" and received enthusiastic reviews. In The New Yorker, Katy Waldman writes that "Dreyer beckons readers by showing that his rules make prose pleasurable...The author’s delight in his tool kit is palpable." In Paste, Frannie Jackson recommends the book as "invaluable to everyone who wants to shore up their writing skills and an utter treat for anyone who simply revels in language." In The Wall Street Journal, Ben Yagoda finds "wisdom and good sense on nearly every page of 'Dreyer’s English.'" (Yagoda also notes a trend of "copy editors’ memoirs-cum-style guides", comparing Dreyer's English to "the splendid Between You & Me: Confessions of a Comma Queen" from New Yorker copy editor Mary Norris.)

The Washington Post calls Dreyer "the unofficial language guru on Twitter".

Personal life 
Dreyer lives in New York City.

See also
 Strunk & White

References

External links
 Twitter
 Excerpt from Dreyer's English published by The Paris Review
 Recording of Dreyer reading his essay Writers, be wary of Throat-Clearers and Wan Intensifiers. Very, very wary.

Living people
21st-century American writers
American editors
Writers from New York City
Jewish American writers
Northwestern University alumni
1958 births
21st-century American Jews